Malaekula or Malae Kula (red square) is the proper name of the royal burial grounds in central Nukualofa in the Kingdom of Tonga in the southern Pacific Ocean. The kings of Tonga and their very close relatives (wives, husbands, children) are buried there. Those who are a little farther away from the mainline (cousins, nephews, nieces, inlaws) are buried elsewhere, in other chiefly cemeteries. Kings from older times, (i.e. the Tui Tonga dynasty), are mostly buried in the langi in Mua.

Malaekula is a short distance south of the royal palace along the Hala Tui (kings road). Kings Road is the official name of this road and its name means that this is the last road every Tongan King will travel during his reign, toward his resting place in Mala'ekula. This road is also known as the Hala Paini (pine road) because of the Norfolk pines (a royal tree in Tonga) which were planted by Europeans along this road but all have disappeared due to the deep roots reaching the underground seawater. The cemetery was established when the first king of modern Tonga died, Siaosi Tāufaāhau Tupou I. His tomb is positioned in the middle of the field, such that one can see it there when looking from the palace grounds straight along the Hala Tui .

The word malae means in Tongan: (village)-green, park, playground, etc. but it is also the royal word for cemetery. Kula means red. It is a reminder of the famous kātoanga kula (red festival) held at that place in 1885. The festival was a fundraising event for Tonga college (whose corporate colour is vermilion-red, opened 1882), and everybody was dressed in red that day.

References
 Hixon, Margaret, 2000. Sālote, Queen of Paradise, A Biography. University of Otago Press.
 Wood-Ellem, Elizabeth, 1999. Queen Sālote of Tonga. Auckland University Press.

Cemeteries in Tonga
Nukuʻalofa
Tongan monarchy